Paul J. Andree (January 2, 1924 – November 2, 2014) was an American football and track coach and college athletics administrator. He was the 17th head coach at  Ottawa University in Ottawa, Kansas, serving from 1953 to 1955, and compiling a record at Ottawa of 12–14–1. Andree also coached track at Ottawa. He was the school's athletic director from 1955 until his resignation in February 1956.

As a player, Andree was all-conference at Fort Hays State University in Hays, Kansas for the 1947 season. He began his coaching career at Dodge City Community College in Dodge City, Kansas.

Andree died November 2, 2014 in Albert, Kansas.

Head coaching record

College football

References

1924 births
2014 deaths
Dodge City Conquistadors football coaches
Fort Hays State Tigers football players
Ottawa Braves athletic directors
Ottawa Braves football coaches
College track and field coaches in the United States
People from Barton County, Kansas